Acanthotritus is a genus of beetles in the family Cerambycidae, containing a single species, Acanthotritus dorsalis. It was described by White in 1855.

References

Anisocerini
Beetles described in 1855
Monotypic Cerambycidae genera